Bairagarh may refer to:
  A suburb of the Bhopal city where the Bhopal airport is located
 Bairagarh Airport, the airport of Bhopal
 Bhopal Bairagarh, a railway station in Bhopal suburb
 Bairagarh, Berasia, a locality in the Berasia tehsil of Bhopal district; located near the Dungaria dam